Kim Kang-Nam  (born on July 19, 1954) is a former South Korea football player.

His former clubs include Yukong Elephants and Daewoo Royals. His brothers were also footballers; twin brother Kim Sung-Nam and elder brother Kim Jung-Nam.

References

External links
 

Jeju United FC players
Busan IPark players
K League 1 players
Living people
1954 births
Sea Bee players

Association football midfielders
South Korean footballers
South Korea international footballers